Plectrypops lima, the shy soldier, is a species of soldierfish from the genus Plectrypops. It can be found in the Indo-Pacific region from East Africa to Chile, north to Japan and the Ogasawara Islands. It is an uncommon inhabitant of reefs. During the day, it hides in deep crevices and comes out at night. It is solitary and cryptic. It feeds on small crustaceans, crustacean larvae and small fishes.

References

Fish of the Pacific Ocean
Taxa named by Achille Valenciennes
Fish of the Indian Ocean
Holocentridae